The 2023 World Baseball Classic Pool B was the second of four pools of the 2023 World Baseball Classic that took place from March 9–13 at the Tokyo Dome in Tokyo, Japan. The top two teams automatically qualified for the top eight knockout stage, beginning with the quarterfinal in Tokyo and the remaining of the bracket in Miami.

The teams in Pool B consisted of Australia, China, newcomer Czech Republic, hosts Japan, and South Korea. Japan won the pool and advanced to the quarterfinals, along with Australia as runners-up. China was relegated to the 2026 World Baseball Classic qualification round through their win percentage.

Shohei Ohtani of Japan was named the most valuable player of Pool B.

Teams

Standings

Summary

|}

Matches

Australia vs South Korea

China vs Japan

Czech Republic vs China

South Korea vs Japan

China vs Australia

Czech Republic vs Japan

Czech Republic vs South Korea

Japan vs Australia

Australia vs Czech Republic

South Korea vs China
This was China's worst defeat in the World Baseball Classic, with South Korea having scored 22 runs, the highest number of runs in any of the World Baseball Classic competition. China were also the first team to lose all four games.

Statistics

Source:

Leading hitters

Power

Efficiency

Leading pitchers

References

Pool B
World Baseball Classic Pool B
International baseball competitions hosted by Japan
World Baseball Classic Pool B
Sports competitions in Tokyo